The following television stations in the United States brand as channel 13 (though neither using virtual channel 13 nor broadcasting on physical RF channel 13):
 KJCT-DT3 in Grand Junction, Colorado

The following television stations in Mexico brand as channel 13 (though neither using virtual channel 13 nor broadcasting on physical RF channel 13):
 XHDTV-TDT in Tecate, Baja California, serving Tijuana, Baja California/San Diego, California, United States

The following television stations in the United States formerly branded as channel 13:
 KPSE-LD in Palm Springs, California
 WSCG in Baxley, Georgia

13 branded
13